Shokoofeh Azar (born 1972) is an Iranian-Australian author and journalist. Her novel, The Enlightenment of the Greengage Tree, has been nominated for the Stella Prize and the International Booker Prize.

Life 
Azar was born in Iran in 1972. Her father was an author and a poet, and she studied literature in university before becoming a writer and journalist. She began her career as an editor and wrote as well for a literary encyclopedia in Iran. She later worked as an editor in a newspaper, before taking up writing as a journalist.

As a journalist, she covered issues relating to human rights, and particularly, women's rights. She was arrested thrice in connection with her work, which was often critical of the Iranian government, and had been placed in solitary confinement for a period of three months during one such arrest.

On advice from her family, she fled Iran to Turkey, and from there to Indonesia, from where she traveled by boat, arriving at an Australian refugee detention center on Christmas Island in 2011. She was granted political asylum in Australia in 2011. She did not speak English upon her arrival in Australia, and learned the language as an adult. She currently lives in Geelong, Victoria. She graduated with a Bachelor of Communications with Honours via Deakin University’s Cloud Campus.

Writing 
Azar's 2020 novel, The Enlightenment of the Greengage Tree is set in Iran, deploying magic realism to narrate the incidents surrounding the life of a family in Iran during the 1979 Islamic Revolution. The novel was originally written in Farsi,  and was first published in English translation by the Wild Dingo Press in Australia in 2017. The translator has chosen to remain anonymous. It was nominated for the Stella Prize for Fiction in Australia in 2018. It was also on the long list for the International Booker Prize in 2020, and Azar is the first Iranian author to have been nominated for the prize. The book was republished for audiences outside Australia by Europa Editions.

Publications 

 Companion in Writing and Editing Essays
  
 
 The woman who went to stand there., Westerly; Jun2014, Vol. 59 Issue 1, p18-24, 7p 
 That's what its name is: Forget-me-not. Westerly; Jun2013, Vol. 58 Issue 1, p232-236, 5p

Awards  

 (1997) Best Book Award (Iran): for Companion in Writing and Editing Essays (in Farsi)
 (2018) Stella Prize for Fiction: nominated for The Enlightenment of the Greengage Tree
 The River Woman. Westerly; Jun2013, Vol. 58 Issue 1, p237-243, 7p 
 (2020) International Booker Prize for Fiction: nominated for The Enlightenment of the Greengage Tree

References

External links
 Shokoofeh Azar - Deakin University
 Shokoofeh - National Book Foundation
 Stella Prize

1972 births
Living people
20th-century women writers
Iranian writers
Australian writers
Iranian women writers
Australian women writers